An anthem without a title was the untitled anthem of the Netherlands Antilles. It was written in English by Zahira Hiliman from Sint Maarten and translated into the Papiamento language by Lucille Berry-Haseth from Curaçao. The anthem was written in two of the three official languages of the Netherlands Antilles, English and Papiamento. It was adopted in 2000. In addition to this one, many of the islands in the Netherlands Antilles had their own regional anthems.

On 10 October 2010, the Netherlands Antilles was dissolved into Curaçao, Sint Maarten and the three public bodies of the Caribbean Netherlands.

Lyrics

Papiamentu lyrics

1. 

Bridge

Chorus

2. 

3.

English lyrics

1. Our island in the sea, like gems they seem to be,

outstanding from a golden crown of blissful royalty.

Though their people and their culture colorful may seem,

they yet uniquely blend to be just one family.
 

Bridge

So we, your people raise our voice in love and unity

Chorus

Dear Netherlands Antilles, so beautiful to me.

I’m proud to be a part of you, a patriot I shall be.

Yes Netherlands Antilles, I pledge my loyalty,

To you always will be true; I say may God bless you.

2. So blessed with sunny skies and clear welcoming seas,

each island like a link that forms this chain of unity.

May differ in our language, yet meet on common ground,

When some say "Sweet Antilles", some say "Dushi Antia ta".

3. Yes, proud are we to be identified with you,

dear Netherlands Antilles, to you we will be true.

So we declare and vow, with dignity and love,

Our nation we will always serve, may God keep us as one.

References

External links
 The anthem of the Netherlands Antilles at nationalanthems.info, with lyrics and recording
 An instrumental rendition performed by the Slovak State Philharmonic Orchestra and conducted by Peter Breiner - Youtube
Music

Historical national anthems
Dutch Antillean culture
Papiamento-language mass media
North American anthems
Dutch anthems